Marcel Schrötter (born 2 January 1993) is a German motorcycle racer.

Born in Vilgertshofen, Schrötter started out in the German 125cc National Championship in 2007 and finished fifth in his debut campaign, before he took back-to-back titles in 2008 and 2009. In the 2008 season the young german made his World Championship debut as a wildcard rider at the Sachsenring, before three further races in 2009, with a highly impressive fifth place in the final round of the season at Valencia. He has been racing in the Moto2 class for ten years, scoring five podiums.

Career

Early career
Schrötter contested his first race in 2002, at the age of nine, when he won the DMSB/dmsj pocket bike junior cup. In 2003, Schrötter switched to the ADAC Mini Bike Cup, where he competed for two years. In 2005, the Bavarian was invited by five-time world champion Toni Mang to his motorcycle training sessions at the Hockenheim and Salzburgring circuits, where he impressed. In the same year, he finished third in the ADAC Junior Cup with one race win, and in 2006 Schrötter achieved four race wins, improving to second place in the overall standings.

National championship
Since 2007 Schrötter has been coached and supported by Toni Mang, who takes care of sporting and technical matters, as well as finding sponsors. Sepp Schlögl and Adi Stadler are in charge of the motorbike and business decisions. Schrötter competed for the Toni Mang team on Honda RS125 in the 125cc class of the International German Motorcycle Championship (IDM). In his very first race in this class at the Lausitzring, at the age of 14, he took second place behind the eventual German champion Georg Fröhlich. Schrötter finished the 2007 season in fifth place overall.

In the 2008 season, the Bavarian celebrated his first IDM victory at the first round of the season at the Lausitzring. As the season progressed, Schrötter achieved a further four victories, narrowly beating Dutchman Joey Litjens in the overall standings to win the eight-liter title. He also competed sporadically in the Spanish championship, where he won the first round of the season in Valencia.

In 2009 Schrötter dominated the IDM 125, winning the first three races at the Lausitzring, Oschersleben and Nürburgring. At the Sachsenring, the Bavarian had to admit defeat to Jonas Folger and Jakub Kornfeil, but since they were not eligible for points in the 125cc IDM, he also received the maximum 25 points here. After finishing second at the Salzburgring, Schrötter secured his second German championship title at the age of 16, with victory at the Schleizer Dreieck on August 2, 2009, two rounds before the end of the season. He is the first rider since Alfred Waibel in 1988 to succeed in defending his 125cc title.

125cc World Championship
Schrötter made his Grand Prix motorcycle racing debut in the 2008 season, in the 125cc class at the German Grand Prix at the Sachsenring, one of his favorite circuits. He started as a wildcard rider and scored three world championship points straight away, finishing 13th.

In 2009, again riding as a wildcard at Sachsenring, Schrötter qualified fourth on the grid in wet conditions. He finished the race in twelfth place, scoring four points. He would also enter the Czech Grand Prix and the Valencia Grand Prix this year, finishing in 13th and 5th respectively. These good results earned him a full-time ride for next season.

Schrötter competed in the 2010 season for Team Interwetten Honda 125 on a Honda 125cc. He scored points in ten races that season, but ended no higher than 12th in any races. He finished with 27 total points and 18th in the championship.

Mahindra Racing (2011–2012)
In 2011 he competed in the same 125cc class for the Indian Mahindra Racing factory team. He had a virtually identical season, finishing in the points nine times, with a season's best of 9th in Assen. He ended the championship in 15th place, with 36 total points.

Schrötter stayed for one last year in the smallest class, which has been re-branded from 125cc class, to Moto3. He was partnered at Mahindra by Danny Webb. He had an awful start to the year, finishing in the points only once in eight races, a 12th place in Le Mans, and so he was dropped by Mahindra, being replaced by Riccardo Moretti.

Moto2 World Championship

SAG Team (2012–2013)
Luckily for Schrötter, in the 2012 Moto2 World Championship, Ángel Rodríguez also had a weak start to the season, and was dropped by SAG Team after eight non-point scoring races. Schrötter replaced Rodríguez, but failed to score points in the last eight remaining races.

Schrötter was partnered at SAG Team by Xavier Siméon for the 2013 Moto2 World Championship, and the pair scored solid points throughout the season. Schrötter scored points in twelve races, and finished 16th place in the championship with 38 points.

Tech 3 (2014–2015)
Schrötter joined Tech 3 Racing on KTM bikes for the 2014 Moto2 World Championship, and improved on new machinery. He was a steady points finisher throughout the year, scoring points in 15 races. He finished the season 10th in the standings, with 80 points in total.

Staying with Tech3 for the 2015 season as well, Schrötter's performance declined. He scored points in only nine races, and ended the year with 32 total points, only good enough for 20th in the rider's championship.

AGR Team (2016)
Needing a change of scenery, Schrötter was signed by AGR Team, to partner Axel Pons in the 2016 Moto2 World Championship. He had a better year than prior, with the highlight of the season being a 5th place finish in Spielberg, Austria. He scored points in twelve races, finishing 14th in the standings with 64 total points.

Intact GP (2017–2022)
With Jonas Folger moving up to the MotoGP class, a spot opened up next to Sandro Cortese on the other Dynavolt Intact GP bike. The German team wanted two German riders, and so Schrötter was signed for the 2017 Moto2 World Championship. Folger had a win, two second places, and two third places in 2016, something which Schrötter could not replicate in 2017. He ended the year 17th in the championship, with 50 points, seven more than teammate Cortese.

The 2018 season was Schrötter's breakthrough year in the intermediate class, regular top-10s at the beginning of the season, and three 4th places in France, Catalonia, and the Netherlands meant that he was closer to that first podium than ever before. Following a 6th place in Germany, a 7th place in Czechia, and a 7th place in Austria, Schrötter scored his maiden Moto2 podium in Rimini, a 3rd place behind Francesco Bagnaia and Miguel Oliveira, the top two in the championship. Schrötter finished the year 8th in the standings, with 147 points.

Staying with Intact GP for 2019, Schrötter would have the best start to the season in his career. Starting from pole position for the first time in his career, he finished 3rd in the opening GP in Qatar, and then 5th in Argentina. He also scored another pole-position in the United States, and finished the race in 2nd, which meant that he scored more podiums in three races, then he did in the prior seven seasons combined. He would add one more podium during the year, at his home Germand Grand Prix at the Sachsenring, finishing behind Álex Márquez and Brad Binder, the first two riders in the standings, fighting for the title. Schrötter finished the season 8th in the championship, with 137 points.

Schrötter would score his final podium up-to-date in the 2020 season of the Moto2 class Austrian GP, finishing behind Jorge Martín and Luca Marini. He was a regular point scorer throughout the covid-19 shortened season, finishing 9th in the standings, with 81 total points.

Schrötter had an average 2021 season, a season's best result of 5th coming in Mugello. He finished the year 10th in the championship, with 98 points.

The 2022 season would not start the best for Schrötter, with a 10th, a 16th and a 12th place in Qatar, Indonesia and Argentina respectively, but the following seven races were superb from the Bavarian. 4th in Austin, 4th in Portimao, 5th in Jerez, 6th in Le Mans, 9th in Mugello, 5th in Barcelona, and a 4th place at his home German GP meant that he was steadily in the top-10 of the championship. On September 3 however, shortly after the end of the summer break, Schrötter announced that this was his last season with the Intact GP Team, and he will be looking for a new challenge in 2023.

Supersport World Championship

MV Agusta Reparto Corse (2022)
At 2022, Schrötter will make his World Superbike debut in Australia round with the MV Agusta Reparto Corse.

Career statistics

Grand Prix motorcycle racing

By season

By class

Races by year
(key) (Races in bold indicate pole position, races in italics indicate fastest lap)

 Half points awarded as less than two thirds of the race distance (but at least three full laps) was completed.

WorldSSP

Races by year
(key) (Races in bold indicate pole position; races in italics indicate fastest lap)

References

External links

125cc World Championship riders
Moto2 World Championship riders
Moto3 World Championship riders
1993 births
Living people
German motorcycle racers
Supersport World Championship riders
German racing drivers
Engstler Motorsport drivers
Racing drivers from Bavaria